Belizean English is the set of varieties of the English language spoken in Belize and by members of the Belizean diaspora.

History
The development of Caribbean English, including Belizean English, is dated to the West Indian exploits of Elizabethan sea dogs, which are credited with introducing to England names for Caribbean flora, fauna, and various other things via, for instance, Hakluyt's Principall Navigations of 1589 and Raleigh's Discoverie of the Empyre of Guiana of 1596. As English settlements followed shortly thereafter, Caribbean English has been deemed 'the oldest exportation of that language from its British homeland.'

Phonology
Pronunciation in Belizean English tends towards Caribbean English, except that the former is non-rhotic.

In 2013, it was noted that spoken Belizean English is heavily influenced by Belizean Creole, as 'both the lexicon and syntactic constructions often follow creole.' The influence has been deemed strong enough to argue 'that spoken [Belizean] English is simply a register of creole, relexified and restructured through contact with mainstream [non-Belizean] English.' However, it has been further noted that one may describe this phenomenon 'from the opposite perspective and claim [Belizean] creole to be a register of [Belizean] English.'

Lexicology
The largest proportion of the lexicon unique to Belizean English is thought to name local flora, fauna, and cuisine. Notably, the most significant donor language to this portion of Belizean English lexicon is thought to be the Miskito language, not Mayan languages, 'as might be expected.' Other donor languages include Mayan languages, African languages (via Jamaican English), and Spanish (particularly for cuisine).

In 2013, it was noted that spelling in official contexts, such as in government, tended to follow British conventions, while that in commercial spaces tended to prefer American usage, with spelling in popular written media described as 'highly inconsistent, following the conventions of the writer.'

Sociolinguistics
In 2017, it was noted that – 
The aforementioned study suggested that such attitude towards Belizean English might be related to attitudes towards code-switching between English and Kriol, as the latter was described by the study's Belizean informants 'as an index for educational attainment and therefore for class, as it apparently requires formal training to learn to differentiate the two [ie English and Kriol].' However, the social regard for exogamous dialects of English is thought to be decreasing in Belize, though this has been linked to a concomitant rise in the prestige of Belizean Creole, rather than that of Belizean English.

Study
The earliest scholarly dictionary of Caribbean English is thought to have been the 1967 Dictionary of Jamaican English. During Easter of that same year, the Caribbean Association of Headmasters and Headmistresses resolved – 
Said resolution was promptly forwarded to Richard Allsopp, who by mid-1967 'already had some ten shoe-boxes each of about 1,000 6 × 4 cards and many loose unfiled cuttings, notes and other material [from Guyana, the Lesser Antilles, Belize, Jamaica, and Trinidad].' In 1971, Allsopp introduced the Caribbean Lexicography Project as 'a survey of [English] usage in the intermediate and upper ranges of the West Indian speech continuum.' This set the stage for the seminal Dictionary of Caribbean English Usage, first published 1996.

In 2013, it was noted that Belizean English may not constitute a single dialect. For instance, the English spoken in Garifuna-majority settlements in the southeastern coast of Belize 'includes distinctive borrowings which are not found elsewhere in the country.' It was further noted that, though Belizean English is not a tonal language, some of its words 'are not correctly pronounced unless the relative pitch heights are accurate.'

Notes and references

Explanatory footnotes

Short citations

Full citations 

 
 
 
 
 
 
 
 
 
 
 
 
 
 

Dialects of English
Languages of Belize